Constantinianus was a Byzantine military commander during the reign of Justinian the Great who took part in the Justinian’s Gothic War. After the death of Mundus he was sent into Dalmatia to defend Salona. While he was still gathering his troops a Gothic force under Gripas captured Salona. Hearing of the approach of a large Byzantine force Gripas retreated when Constantinianus moved against him. Constantinianus immediately began rebuilding the crumbling fortifications. After this Constantinianus quickly gained control of Dalmatia and Liburnia. Constantinianus’ strong position in the Balkans In combination with the Frankish threat caused the Gothic king Witigis to send only a small force to defend Rome from Belisarius but instead position himself as such that he could move to counter threats from all directions. As the city of Rome surrendered to Belisarius without a fight, its garrison abandoning it, Witigis’ strategy failed. Later Constantinianus defeated a gothic force under Uligisalus, who was sent to attack him, at the Battle of Scardon. The Goths retreats to the city of Burnus. After Asinarius arrived with Suevic reinforcements Constantinianus noticed he couldn’t defeat the combined army and retreated. He ordered an extra ditch to be dug around Salona and prepared for a siege. The Gothic army under Uligisalus and Asinarius built a ditch and a stockade around the city to blockade it by land while the Gothic fleet moved to close the blockade by sea. In a sally the Gothic fleet was defeated allowing the Romans freedom of movement by sea but the siege continued on land.

References 

Generals of Justinian I